USS Cloues (DE-265) was an  of the United States Navy during World War II. She was sent off into the Pacific Ocean to protect convoys and other ships from Japanese submarines and fighter aircraft. She performed escort and antisubmarine operations in dangerous battle areas and returned home with three battle stars.

Namesake
Edward Blanchard Cloues was born on 25 December 1917 at Warner, New Hampshire. He graduated from the United States Naval Academy on 6 June 1940.

Construction and commissioning
Cloues was launched on 6 April 1943 by Boston Navy Yard; sponsored on her commissioning day by Mrs. H. B. Cloues, mother of Ensign Cloues; and commissioned on 10 August 1943.

World War II Pacific Theater operations
Cloues stood out of Boston, Massachusetts, on 4 October 1943 for New York, the Panama Canal, San Francisco, California, and Pearl Harbor, arriving on 17 November. She conducted gunnery exercises, battle practice, and landing operations off Oahu until 30 November, when she sailed in convoy to San Francisco. For the next months she had escort duty in the Hawaiian Islands and to San Francisco. On 29 February, she sailed from Pearl Harbor for Johnston Island and the Gilberts, arriving on 11 March for escort duty and to cover the landings at Bikini, Enyu, and Rongelap. From 22 March Cloues was based on Kwajalein for screening duty in the Marshalls.

Assigned special scouting mission 
Cloues was assigned to a special mission scouting the Japanese-held islands of Jaluit, Wotje, Mille, and Loj (Erikub Atoll) between 2 and 27 May 1944. She launched and recovered a reconnaissance party consisting of an officer, an interpreter, and three native scouts who operated with outriggers. This group was able to evaluate the results of bombings of these islands during the previous months. With her mission successfully completed, Cloues resumed escort duties from Eniwetok in support of the Guam operation.

Continued escort operations
Convoy escort duty between Eniwetok and Saipan occupied Cloues from 25 November until 23 December 1944, and from that time until 10 March 1945 she had escort duty from Eniwetok to Ulithi and Kossol Roads. On 22 March Cloues sailed in support of the Okinawa operation serving in anti-submarine and anti-aircraft screening, on plane guard duty, destroying mines, and transferring personnel, mail, and freight. Cloues returned to Ulithi on 28 April, and sailed on 4 May for San Pedro Bay, Philippine Islands, for screening duty until 27 May, when she returned to Ulithi. She sailed on 9 June for San Pedro Bay, where she made rendezvous for the amphibious landings at Balikpapan. She returned to San Pedro Bay on 8 July, and sailed for Eniwetok, Pearl Harbor, and San Francisco, arriving on 29 July.

Post-War decommissioning 
Cloues was decommissioned on 26 November 1945, and sold on 22 May 1947.

Awards 
Cloues received three battle stars for World War II service.

References

External links
 

Evarts-class destroyer escorts
World War II frigates and destroyer escorts of the United States
Ships built in Boston
1943 ships